Saint-Cyr Johan Bakayoko (born 20 April 2003) is a Belgian professional footballer who plays as a winger for Eredivisie club PSV and their reserve squad Jong PSV.

International career
Born in Belgium, Bakayoko is of Ivorian descent. He is a youth international for Belgium.

Career statistics

Club

Notes

Honours
PSV
Johan Cruyff Shield: 2022

References

External links
Profile at the PSV Eindhoven website

2003 births
Living people
People from Overijse
Belgian people of Ivorian descent
Black Belgian sportspeople
Belgian footballers
Footballers from Flemish Brabant
Association football forwards
Belgium under-21 international footballers
Belgium youth international footballers
Eerste Divisie players
Eredivisie players
Oud-Heverlee Leuven players
Club Brugge KV players
K.V. Mechelen players
R.S.C. Anderlecht players
PSV Eindhoven players
Jong PSV players
Belgian expatriate footballers
Belgian expatriate sportspeople in the Netherlands
Expatriate footballers in the Netherlands